Bryopteris gaudichaudii is a species of liverworts in the family Lejeuneaceae. It is found in Madagascar and Réunion. Its natural habitat is subtropical or tropical dry forests. It is threatened by habitat loss.

References

Lejeuneaceae
Critically endangered plants
Taxonomy articles created by Polbot